Martin's Potato Chips is a manufacturer of potato chips, popcorn, and other salted snack foods. Martin's headquarters is located in south-central Pennsylvania, at 5847 Lincoln Highway West in Thomasville; the company distributes to retailers in Pennsylvania, Virginia, and Maryland. It was founded by Harry and Fairy Martin, in 1941.

Martin's potato chips were served on Air Force One during the terms of presidents Bill Clinton and George W. Bush. The company sponsors the York Revolution professional baseball team of the Atlantic League of Professional Baseball. Martin's recycles its waste byproducts, using potato peels and refuse from the potato cleaning process for cattle feed and fertilizer. The company's plant offers factory tours.

References

External links 
 Company home page

Companies based in York County, Pennsylvania
Snack food manufacturers of Pennsylvania
American companies established in 1941
Food and drink companies established in 1941
1941 establishments in Pennsylvania
Manufacturing companies based in Pennsylvania
Brand name snack foods